La Scuola Cattolica is a quarterly academic journal of Theology, edited by the Seminary of the Archdiocese of Milan, in Venegono Inferiore (Varese – Italy). It was established in 1873 and still remains in publication today.

The Journal's language is Italian; every article has an abstract in Italian and English.

Publication history 
In 1872, some priests from Lombardy decided to create a new monthly apologetical journal, against liberal ideas, in defense of the Pope and the Catholic Church. La Scuola Cattolica was established in 1873 and the first director was mons. Lucido Maria Parocchi. In 1891 the Journal was merged with the La Scienza Italiana of Bologna, so the title became La Scuola Cattolica e la Scienza italiana (a translation could be: The Catholic Teaching and the Italian Science).

In 1901 the Journal's property passed to the new established Pontifical Faculty of Theology of Milan in the Seminary of Milan in Venegono Inferiore (Varese – Italy), and the title switched back to the original La Scuola Cattolica. When in 1967 the Faculty of Theology moved to Milan, the property of the Journal remained to the Seminary of Milan.

Nowadays La Scuola Cattolica is the academic Journal primarily written by teachers and researchers of the Seminary of Milan.

Issues 
The journal embraces all areas of theology (dogmatic, fundamental, biblical, moral) as well as other types of religious studies (philosophical, historical, social and psychological).

See also 
 List of theological journals

References

External links 
 Journal's website
 Publisher's website
 database of Journal's articles

Other resources 

Italian-language journals
Catholic studies journals
Quarterly journals
Publications established in 1873